The quenda (Isoodon obesulus fusciventer), also known as the  western brown bandicoot, is a small marsupial species endemic to South Western Australia.

Though it is currently treated as a subspecies of the southern brown bandicoot (Isoodon obesulus), such as by the IUCN where it is given the status of least concern, a 2018 paper proposed to raise it to species rank due to molecular and morphological analysis which revealed it was more closely related to the golden bandicoot (Isoodon auratus).

Currently recognised as a separate species by ASM, AFD, ALA.

Quenda are one of the few native marsupials that can still be seen in Perth’s urban bushland reserves. They are vulnerable to predation by feral foxes and cats and Quenda populations can recover where predators are controlled.

Description 
Quenda are small marsupials with a long pointed muzzle; they are usually stockily built, with short limbs and neck. The head and body length is 400–500 mm, tail length 130 mm and weight about 1200–1850g. Teeth are small, relatively even-sized and pointed, as in typical insectivore teeth. The bandicoot body is basically designed for digging in soil to extract invertebrate food. The elongate muzzle and powerful foreclaws are used for probing in crevices and rooting and digging in soil.

Biology and behaviour 
This species is a solitary nocturnal feeder, but can be often observed active at times during the day depending on the proximity of predators. Quenda are omnivorous and as such they consume a range of organisms such as arthropods, plant roots, tubers and fungi.  Sourcing these items comes from foraging across the ground surface or by penetrating the top soil through digging. The unique conical diggings that are a result of foraging by the quenda, have proven to have a positive effect on an ecosystem by aerating the soil and allowing nutrients to cycle more efficiently.

The males are territorial and aggressive to other Quenda and will fight each other. This often results in ears being torn and tails lost.

Quenda breed throughout the year with a peak in spring. The backward opening pouch contains eight teats arranged in an incomplete circle, and accommodates one to six (usually two to four) young in a litter. Two or three litters may be reared in a year, though this is dependent upon food availability. It has been found that older females produce more litters. In eastern Australia, gestation period is short (12–15 days). The young are weaned when about 60–70 days old.

Habitat 
Scrubby, often swampy, vegetation with dense cover up to 1 m high, often feeds in adjacent forest and woodland that is burnt on a regular basis and in areas of pasture and cropland lying close to dense cover. Populations inhabiting Jarrah and Wandoo forests are usually associated with watercourses. Quenda will thrive in more open habitat subject to introduced predator control. On the Swan Coastal Plain, Quenda are often associated with wetlands.

Conservation status 
According to the WA Department of Biodiversity, Conservation and Attractions, this species' conservation status is Priority 4: Rare, Near Threatened and other species in need of monitoring.

References 

Marsupials of Australia
Mammals described in 1841
Taxa named by John Edward Gray
Peramelemorphs